De Zouaven is a football club from Grootebroek, Netherlands. The club was founded in 1930. Its first squad plays in the Vierde Divisie since 2020, after achieving promotion from the Eerste Klasse Sunday. De Zouaven also previously played in the Vierde Divisie (hoofdklasse), from 2010 through 2015.

References

External links
 Official site

Football clubs in the Netherlands
Football clubs in North Holland
1931 establishments in the Netherlands
Association football clubs established in 1931
Sport in Stede Broec